666 Desdemona is a stony asteroid from the middle region of the asteroid belt, approximately 29 kilometers in diameter. It was discovered on 23 July 1908, by German astronomer August Kopff at Heidelberg Observatory in southern Germany, and named after Desdemona, character in Shakespeare's The Tragedy of Othello, the Moor of Venice. The name may have been inspired by the asteroid's provisional designation 1908 DM.

Classification and orbit 

Desdemona is a stony S-type asteroid that orbits the Sun in the middle main-belt at a distance of 2.0–3.2 AU once every 4 years and 2 months (1,525 days). Its orbit has an eccentricity of 0.24 and an inclination of 8° with respect to the ecliptic. As no precoveries were taken, the asteroid's observation arc begins with its official discovery observation at Heidelberg.

Physical characteristics

Rotation period 

In 2013, a rotational lightcurve for this asteroid was obtained from photometric observations made by astronomer Anna Marciniak at Poznań Observatory, Poland. It gave a rotation period of  hours with a brightness variation of 0.22 in magnitude, superseding a period from in 2000, obtained at the Californian Santana Observatory, which gave a slightly longer period of  hours and an amplitude of 0.11.

Between 2004 and 2006, three more lightcurves were constructed from photometric observations, but they were all fragmentary and based on results with less than full coverage.

Diameter and albedo 

According to the surveys carried out by the Infrared Astronomical Satellite IRAS, the Japanese Akari satellite, and NASA's Wide-field Infrared Survey Explorer (WISE) with its subsequent NEOWISE mission, the asteroid's surface has an albedo between 0.095 and 0.106. While the Collaborative Asteroid Lightcurve Link agrees with the space-based IRAS and Akari surveys on a diameter of approximately 27 kilometers, the results from WISE and NEOWISE found a larger diameter of 31.5 to 32.7 kilometers, respectively.

Naming 

This minor planet was named after Desdemona, the wife of Othello in the play The Tragedy of Othello, the Moor of Venice written by William Shakespeare in 1604 (also see ). It is presumed that the naming of "Desdemona" could have been inspired by the two letters of its provisional designation (1908 DM). One of the satellites of Uranus (Uranus X), discovered by the Voyager 2 in 1986, is also named Desdemona.

Notes

References

External links 
 Photométrie des astéroïdes et effets de sélection Stéphane Fauvaud: rotation period of (666) Desdemona, slide #12
 Asteroid Lightcurve Database (LCDB), query form (info )
 Dictionary of Minor Planet Names, Google books
 Asteroids and comets rotation curves, CdR – Observatoire de Genève, Raoul Behrend
 Discovery Circumstances: Numbered Minor Planets (1)-(5000) – Minor Planet Center
 
 

000666
Discoveries by August Kopff
Named minor planets
19080723